Kadıköy is a village in the Kiğı District, Bingöl Province, Turkey. The village is populated by Kurds of the Xiran tribe and had a population of 62 in 2021.

References 

Villages in Kiğı District
Kurdish settlements in Bingöl Province